The 2012 AMJ Campbell Shorty Jenkins Classic is an annual curling bonspiel that was held from September 13 to 16 at the Brockville Country Club in Brockville, Ontario as part of the 2012–13 World Curling Tour. The winning team of John Epping took home the purse for the men's of CAD$40,700 and Tracy Horgan took home CAD$16,400, after winning the women's event.

Men

Teams

Round Robin Standings

Results
All times local (Eastern Time Zone)

Draw 1
September 13, 4:00 PM

Draw 2
September 13, 6:30 PM

Draw 3
September 13, 9:30 PM

Draw 4
September 14, 8:00 AM

Draw 5
September 14, 10:15 AM

Draw 6
September 14, 1:00 PM

Draw 7
September 14, 3:15 PM

Draw 8
September 14, 6:00 PM

Draw 9
September 14, 8:30 PM

Draw 10
September 15, 8:00 AM

Draw 11
September 15, 10:15 AM

Draw 12
September 15, 1:00 PM

Draw 13
September 15, 3:15 PM

Draw 14
September 15, 6:00 PM

Draw 15
September 15, 8:30 PM

Playoffs

Quarterfinal
September 16, 9:00 AM

Semifinal
September 16, 12:30 PM

Final
September 16, 3:30 PM

Women

Teams

Standings

Results

Draw 1
September 13, 4:00 PM

Draw 3
September 13, 9:30 PM

Draw 5
September 14, 10:15 AM

Draw 6
September 14, 1:00 PM

Draw 8
September 14, 6:00 PM

Draw 9
September 14, 8:30 PM

Draw 10
September 15, 8:00 AM

Draw 11
September 15, 10:15 AM

Draw 13
September 15, 3:15 PM

Draw 14
September 15, 6:00 PM

Playoffs

Semifinal
September 16, 12:30 PM

Final
September 16, 3:30 PM

External links
Event Home Page

2012
AMJ Campbell Shorty Jenkins Classic
Sport in Brockville